The 2018 Girls' EuroHockey Youth Championships was the 10th edition of the Girls' EuroHockey Youth Championships. It will be held from 15 to 21 July 2018 in Santander, Spain at the Ruth Beitia Sports Complex.

Qualified teams
The following teams participated in the 2018 EuroHockey Youth Championship:

Format
The eight teams will be split into two groups of four teams. The top two teams advance to the semifinals to determine the winner in a knockout system. The bottom two teams play in a new group with the teams they did not play against in the group stage. The last two teams will be relegated to the Youth Championship II.

Results
''All times are local (UTC+2).

Preliminary round

Pool A

Pool B

Fifth to eighth place classification

Pool C
The points obtained in the preliminary round against the other team are taken over.

First to fourth place classification

Semifinals

Third place game

Final

Final standings

References

Girls' EuroHockey Youth Championships
Youth
EuroHockey Youth Championships
EuroHockey Youth Championships
EuroHockey Youth Championships
International women's field hockey competitions hosted by Spain
Sport in Santander, Spain
EuroHockey Youth Championships